Ahmed Mohammed Karenshi (born 19 August 1988) is a Saudi Arabian professional footballer who plays as a midfielder for Al-Riyadh.

References

External links 
 

1988 births
Living people
Saudi Arabian footballers
Al-Wehda Club (Mecca) players
Al-Ahli Saudi FC players
Hajer FC players
Al-Ansar FC (Medina) players
Al-Qadsiah FC players
Al-Taawoun FC players
Jeddah Club players
Al-Ain FC (Saudi Arabia) players
Al-Bukayriyah FC players
Al-Riyadh SC players
Association football midfielders
Saudi First Division League players
Saudi Professional League players
Saudi Second Division players